Janówek  is a village in the administrative district of Gmina Jeżów Sudecki, within Jelenia Góra County, Lower Silesian Voivodeship, in south-western Poland.

References

Villages in Karkonosze County